Mníšek is a hamlet in the municipality of Nová Ves v Horách in the Ústí nad Labem Region in the Czech Republic. The formerly peaceful resort became one of the liveliest places in the Most District in the Ore Mountains after the opening of the Mníšek/Deutscheinsiedel border crossing.

The village lies at an elevation of 700 to 765 metres above sea level. It is separated from the village of the same (German) name in Germany by the river Schweinitz.

Literature
Heimatkunde des Brüxer Schulbezirkes – Gerichtsbezirke Brüx, Oberleutensdorf, Katharinaberg. Verlag des deutschen Lehrervereines im Bezirke Brüx, Brüx, 1908

External links 
Postcard views of Einsiedl

Neighbourhoods in the Czech Republic
Populated places in Most District
Czech Republic–Germany border crossings